Fascin-2 is a protein that in humans is encoded by the FSCN2 gene.

This gene encodes a member of the fascin protein family. Fascins crosslink actin into filamentous bundles within dynamic cell extensions. This family member is proposed to play a role in photoreceptor disk morphogenesis. A mutation in this gene results in one form of autosomal dominant retinitis pigmentosa and macular degeneration. Multiple transcript variants encoding different isoforms have been found for this gene.

References

Further reading

External links
  GeneReviews/NCBI/NIH/UW entry on Retinitis Pigmentosa Overview